is a 2011 Japanese film edited, written, and directed by Hirokazu Kore-eda. This film stars real-life brothers Koki Maeda and Oshiro Maeda, along with veteran actress Kirin Kiki and actor Joe Odagiri.

I Wish tells the story of two young brothers who got separated and had to live in different cities – one with their father, one with their mother and her parents – and dream of reuniting.

Cast
Kohki Maeda as Kohichi Ohsako, the older brother
Ohshiro Maeda as Ryunosuke Kinami, the younger brother
Nene Otsuka as Nozomi Ohsako
Joe Odagiri as  Kenji Kinami
Ryoga Hayashi as Yu Fukumoto
Hosinosuke Nagayosi as Shin Ohta 
Kyara Uchida as Megumi Ariyoshi
Kanna Hashimoto as Kanna Hayami
Yuna Taira as Yuna Taira
Rento Isobe as Rento Isobe
Yui Natsukawa as Kyouko Ariyoshi
Hiroshi Abe as Mamoru Sakagami, a teacher
Masami Nagasawa as Sachi Mitsumura, a teacher
Yoshio Harada as Wataru Yamamoto
Kirin Kiki as Hideko Ohsako
Isao Hashizume as Shukichi Ohsako

Production
Hirokazu Kore-eda started with the basic premise of the film but did not write the script until after the lead child actors had been cast, so that he could "get more ideas from them." Film Business Asia reported in October 2010 that production had begun.

Release
The film was released in Japan on 11 June 2011.

Critical response
The site's critical consensus reads, "Elliptical and deliberately paced yet steadily absorbing, I Wish presents a beguiling portrait of childhood that grounds its sweetly nostalgic glow with well-rounded characters and attention to detail." On Metacritic, the film has an average score of 80 out of 100, based on 22 critics, indicating "generally favorable reviews".

Soundtrack
The soundtrack from the film was created by a band called Quruli.

Track listing on record.

鹿児島おはら節 KAGOSHIMA OHARA BUSHI 
プールとタコ焼きと市バス POOL TO TAKOYAKI TO SHI BUS 
龍之介と父親 RYUUNOSUKE TO CHICHIOYA 
学校へ行こう GAKKOU HE IKOU 
周吉と山本 SHUUKICHI TO YAMAMOTO 
中央駅にて CHUUOU EKI NITE 
花火だ花火だ HANABI DA HANABI DA 
鹿児島にて KAGOSHIMA NITE 
ぞわぞわ ZOWAZOWA 
それぞれの日々 SOREZORE NO HIBI 
軍資金のテーマ GUNSHIKIN NO THEME 
最終列車 SAISHUU RESSHA 
コスモス COSMOS 
走れ HASHIRE 
願い NEGAI 
帰路 KIRO 
奇跡 KISEKI

References

External links
 
Magnolia Pictures official website

Martonova, A. Boys don't cry: the image of the children as a social problem in Hirokazu Koreeda's films. - In: Central Asian Journal Of Art Studies. Almaty, T. Zhurgehov Kazakh National Academy of Arts, 2016. pр. 55–64

2011 films
Films about brothers
Films directed by Hirokazu Kore-eda
Films set in Japan
Films shot in Japan
2010s Japanese-language films
2010s Japanese films